is a current single-member electoral district for the House of Representatives, the lower house of the National Diet of Japan. It is located in Kumamoto and covers Western parts of the prefectural capital Kumamoto (parts of Nishi-ku, shared with the 1st electoral district and parts of Minami-ku, shared with the 4th district), the cities of Arao and Tamana and the Tamana county with its remaining four municipalities, the towns of Nagasu, Nankan, Nagomi and Gyokutō. As of September 2012, 305,563 eligible voters were resident in the district.

Before 1996, the area had been part of the five-member Kumamoto 1st district. The current incumbent for the 2nd district, Liberal Democrat Takeshi Noda, had represented the pre-reform 1st district since 1972 when he succeeded his deceased father-in-law Takeo Noda.

List of representatives

Election results 

 

 
 
 
 
 
 
 

 

 
 
 

 

 
 
 

 

  
 
 

 

 
 
 
 

 

 
 
 
 

 

Note: The decimals stem from anbunhyō ("proportional fractional votes"), see Elections in Japan#Ballots, voting machines and early voting. As Takeshi (彪) Hayashida and Takeshi (毅) Noda have different Kanji for their given names, some voters must have voted for just "Takeshi" in Kana for the votes to be ambiguous.

References 

Kumamoto Prefecture
Districts of the House of Representatives (Japan)